The 1975–76 Israeli League Cup was a cup competition played in the beginning of the 1975–76 season, while the national football team was involved in the 1976 Summer Olympics football tournament qualification.

The cup was split into two competitions, for Liga Leumit and Liga Alef. The top tier's competition was played by clubs ranked 1st to 8th in 1974–75 Liga Leumit, while the second tier's competition was played by clubs ranked 1st and 4th in each of 1974–75 Liga Alef division. The competition was played as a knock-out competition.

The Liga Leumit League Cup was won by Hapoel Hadera, who had beaten Hapoel Tel Aviv 1–0 in the final. The Liga Alef League Cup was won by Maccabi Ramat Amidar, who had beaten Maccabi Haifa 2–1 in the final.

Liga Leumit League Cup

Quarter-finals

Semi-finals

Final

Liga Alef League Cup

Quarter-finals

Semi-finals

Final

Notes

References
100 Years of Football 1906-2006, Elisha Shohat (Israel), 2006

League Cup
Predecessors